Agris is a Latvian language masculine given name. Individuals bearing the name Agris include:
Agris Daņiļevičs (born 1963), choreographer and dance teacher
Agris Elerts (born 1967), luger
Agris Galvanovskis (born 1972), basketball player
Agris Kazeļņiks (born 1973), strongman competitor
Agris Saviels (born 1982), ice hockey defenceman

References

Masculine given names
Latvian masculine given names